Giorgos Xylouris (born September 25, 1965), also known as Psarogiorgis (Greek: Ψαρογιώργης), is a Cretan laouto player and singer.

Xylouris was born into a musical family (his father is Psarantonis (Antonis Xylouris), himself born in 1937; his uncle Nikos Xylouris (1936-1980); his cousin -Nikos's son- Giorgis Xylouris (1960-2015), etc.?), and he grew up in Anogeia, their mountain village in Crete, with a rich musical culture. Xylouris started playing the Cretan laouto, a relative of the lute, at an early age, guided by his uncle Psarogiannis. From eleven years old, he would accompany his father at village functions, and participate in recordings. Giorgos lived for eight years in Melbourne, Australia, where he formed the Xylouris Ensemble "in the early 1990s". Two of the Xylouris Ensemble's albums, Antipodes (1998) and Drakos (1999), were nominated for the ARIA Fine Arts Awards in Australia. In the "2000s", The Xylouris Ensemble expanded to include a younger generation of players, including Psarogiorgis' sons Nikos and Adonis Xylouris, who are based in Melbourne.

Xylouris plays the laouto as a solo instrument, in contrast to the traditional accompaniment role the laouto has in Cretan music. Normally in an ensemble, the laouto provides the rhythmic backing to the lyra, which is par excellence a singer's instrument. In this role, Giorgos is peerless. In the less usual role of lead instrument he has made the laouto a melodic instrument to frame and adorn song.

Xylouris has performed extensively both in his native Crete, in his second home Australia, and internationally at world music festivals, collaborating with musicians from both folk and rock traditions, including Australian drummer Jim White in the duo Xylouris White.

Discography

Albums

See also
  Xylouris White

Awards and nominations

ARIA Music Awards
The ARIA Music Awards is an annual awards ceremony that recognises excellence, innovation, and achievement across all genres of Australian music. They commenced in 1987.

! 
|-
| 1998
| Antipodes
| Best World Music Album
| 
| rowspan="2"| 
|-
| 1999
| Drakos
| Best World Music Album 
| 
|-

References

1965 births
Living people
Traditional musicians
Greek songwriters
20th-century Greek male singers
People from Anogeia
Cretan musicians
Greek laouto players